Part III of Constitution of Nepal describes about Fundamental rights and Duties of Nepalese citizens.

Article 16 to Article 46 of the Nepalese constitution guarantees 31 fundamental rights to Nepalese people. These include freedom to live with dignity, freedom of speech and expression, religious and cultural freedom, right against untouchability and discrimination etc. Article 48 describes duties of every Nepalese. It says safeguard the nationality, sovereignty and 
integrity of Nepal.

Rights described in constitution

 Right to live with dignity (16)
 Right to freedom     (17)
 Right to equality     (18)
 Right to communication     (19)I
 Right relating to justice     (20)
 Right of a victim of a crime    (21)
 Right against torture    (22)
 Right against preventive detention     (23)
 Right against untouchability and discrimination     (24)
 Right relating to property     (25)
 Right to religious freedom     (26)
12.Right to information     (27)

13. Right to privacy     (28)

14. Right against exploitation     (29)

15. Right to clean environment     (30)  

16. Right to education  (31)                    

17.Right to language and culture     (32) 

18. Right to employment     (33) 

19.Right to labor     (34)  

20.Right to health     (35) 

21.Right to food     (36) 

22.Right to shelter     (37) 

23.Right of women     (38) 

24.Right of children     (39) 

25.Right of Dalits     (40) 

26.Right of senior citizen     (41) 

27.Right to social justice     (42) 

28.Right to social security     (43) 

29.Right of consumer     (44) 

30.Right against banishment     (45) 

31.Right to constitutional remedies (46)

References

Constitution of Nepal
Human rights in Nepal